The HTC Desire X (codenamed Protou) was a smartphone designed and developed by HTC. The Desire X is a low-range handset incorporating a dual-core 1 GHz Snapdragon S4 play processor and 4 GB of internal storage expandable with a microSD slot. Aimed at customers of the HTC Desire, launched in 2010, the HTC has a 4-inch diagonal screen, and draws strong resemblance with HTC's 2012 flagship product, the HTC One X. The device came pre-installed with Android 4.0 Ice Cream Sandwich. It is the successor to the HTC Desire S, which was an upgrade from the HTC Desire, HTC's flagship product of 2010.

The Desire X was launched 29 August 2012 in Berlin during the IFA trade show. Although the price of the phone was not disclosed during the unveiling ceremony, the handset was expected to be released in Europe, the Middle East, Africa, and the Asia Pacific region in September 2012.
Desire X was launched in India in October 2012 with a price tag of 19,500.

References

Desire X
Android (operating system) devices
Discontinued smartphones
Mobile phones with user-replaceable battery